Panama Hotel can refer to:
 Panama Hotel (Panama)
 Panama Hotel (San Diego), California, U.S.
 Panama Hotel (Seattle), Washington, U.S.